Richard Scott Blackburn Smith (December 9, 1871 – July 11, 1928) was an American Democratic politician who served as a member of the Virginia Senate, representing the state's 12th district.

References

External links

1871 births
1928 deaths
Democratic Party Virginia state senators